Woodside station was a train station on the B&O Metropolitan Subdivision in the Woodside neighborhood of Silver Spring, Montgomery County, Maryland. It was erected in 1890 in connection with initial development of the Woodside suburb.

History

B&O passenger facility
The station was designed in the Victorian style at the direction of Benjamin Leighton, a real estate developer involved with the development of Woodside and other segregated suburbs along the Metropolitan Branch. Leighton sought to increase property values by establishing a direct connection to the railroad. The station was built in the southern part of the neighborhood on 3rd Street, between its present-day intersections with Ballard Street and Noyes Drive.

Intermodal connections
Pedestrians could connect between the B&O station and the Forest Glen Trolley station three blocks away, at the intersection of present-day Georgia Avenue and Ballard Street.

Fire and replacement
According to a collection of photographs taken by B&O employee E.L. "Tommy" Thompson, Woodside station burned down in the 1920s. Rather than replacing the station, the B&O constructed a section house at the site. The section house was conveniently located, allowing crews a place of refuge in close proximity to the railroad's new interchange with the Georgetown Branch.

Future
Upon the opening of the MTA Purple Line, the area will be served with a direct light rail connection for the first time in almost a century. Light rail trains will be accessible at the 16th Street–Woodside station, on the opposite side of the original B&O right-of-way.<ref>

References

Former Baltimore and Ohio Railroad stations
Railway stations opened in 1890
Railway stations in Montgomery County, Maryland